Grace is an unincorporated community on the South Branch Potomac River in Hampshire County, West Virginia, United States. Grace lies at the intersection of Grace's Cabin Road (West Virginia Secondary Route 28/6) and West Virginia Route 28 across the South Branch from Blues Beach.

References

Unincorporated communities in Hampshire County, West Virginia
Populated places on the South Branch Potomac River
Unincorporated communities in West Virginia